Empresa Cubana de Aeropuertos y Servicios Aeronáuticos S.A. (ECASA) is a government-owned company which operates 22 airports in Cuba, including José Martí International Airport, which serves Havana.

Other responsibilities of ECASA include air traffic control, aviation safety, check-in and baggage handling.

References

See also 
 List of airports in Cuba

Airport operators